The 1973 Liège–Bastogne–Liège was the 59th edition of the Liège–Bastogne–Liège cycle race and was held on 22 April 1973. The race started and finished in Liège. The race was won by Eddy Merckx of the Molteni team.

General classification

References

1973
1973 in Belgian sport
1973 Super Prestige Pernod